Gennady Anatolyevich Tumilovich (born 3 September 1971) is a Belarusian football coach and a former player.

Career

Belarus
Tumilovich started his career at FC Dinamo Brest of Soviet Second League. He then moved to the only club in Soviet Top League from Byelorussian SSR, the capital's FC Dinamo Minsk. After the independence, he played the first ever Belarusian First League, and followed the reverse team Dinamo-2 Minsk promoted to Belarusian Premier League. After a season with second team, he joined the first team in 1993-94 season.

Russia
In 1996, Tumilovich joined Metallurg Krasnoyarsk of Russian First Division. He then played for Zarya Leninsk-Kuznetsky, also in First League. In 1998, he joined Russian Premier League side Zhemchuzhina Sochi, and also played with their reserve team at Russian Second Division.

Israel
In 2000, he joined Hapoel Ironi Rishon LeZion, but returned to Russia for Rostov in the summer.

Belgium
In 2003, he moved to Antwerp. He returned to Russia again for Luch-Energiya Vladivostok of Russian First Division in 2004.

Belarus
In 2007, he moved back to FC Dinamo Minsk.

International career
He was a part of Soviet squad at 1991 FIFA World Youth Championship. Between 1998 and 2004 he has been capped 32 times for Belarus.

Honours
Dinamo Minsk
Belarusian Premier League champion: 1993–94, 1994–95

Individual
Belarusian Footballer of the Year: 2001

References

External links

1971 births
Living people
Footballers from Minsk
Soviet footballers
Belarusian footballers
Association football goalkeepers
Belarusian Premier League players
Russian Premier League players
Belarus international footballers
Belarusian expatriate footballers
Expatriate footballers in Russia
Expatriate footballers in Israel
Expatriate footballers in Belgium
Belarusian expatriate sportspeople in Russia
Belarusian expatriate sportspeople in Israel
Belarusian expatriate sportspeople in Belgium
FC Dynamo Brest players
FC Dinamo Minsk players
FC Dinamo-93 Minsk players
FC Zhemchuzhina Sochi players
Hapoel Rishon LeZion F.C. players
FC Dynamo Moscow players
FC Rostov players
Royal Antwerp F.C. players
FC Luch Vladivostok players
Belarusian football managers
FC Yenisey Krasnoyarsk players